David Stacey (born 22 February 1965) is a British swimmer.

Swimming career
Stacey competed in the men's 1500 metre freestyle at the 1984 Summer Olympics. He represented England in the 400 metres and 1500 metres freestyle events, at the 1982 Commonwealth Games in Brisbane, Queensland, Australia. Four years later he represented England in the same events, at the 1986 Commonwealth Games in Edinburgh, Scotland. He also won the 1985 and 1986 ASA National Championship title in the 1500 metres freestyle event.

References

External links
 

1965 births
Living people
British male swimmers
Olympic swimmers of Great Britain
Swimmers at the 1984 Summer Olympics
Swimmers at the 1982 Commonwealth Games
Swimmers at the 1986 Commonwealth Games
Sportspeople from High Wycombe
Commonwealth Games competitors for England